Sergio Álvarez Díaz (born 23 January 1992) is a Spanish professional footballer who plays for SD Eibar as a central midfielder.

Club career

Sporting Gijón
Álvarez was born in Avilés, Asturias. A product of Sporting de Gijón's prolific youth academy, Mareo, the 17-year-old made it to the reserves during the 2009–10 season, with the side playing in the Segunda División B.

Álvarez made his debut with the main squad on 16 May 2010, starting in a 2–0 away loss against Racing de Santander and thus becoming the second youngest player ever to debut in La Liga for the club, at the age of 18 years and 113 days. However, he lost this record to Juan Muñiz that very match, when the latter entered the pitch in the 46th minute.

In summer 2013, Álvarez was definitely promoted to the first team, now in the Segunda División. On 9 July 2015, after achieving promotion to the top division, he renewed with the Rojiblancos until 2019.

Eibar
On 26 July 2018, after spending 14 years at the club, Álvarez left Sporting and signed a four-year contract with SD Eibar in the top tier.

International career
In January 2010, Álvarez was summoned for the Spain under-18 team for the 'XXXVI International Atlantic Cup'.

Career statistics

Club

References

External links
Sporting Gijón official profile 

1992 births
Living people
People from Avilés
Spanish footballers
Footballers from Asturias
Association football midfielders
La Liga players
Segunda División players
Segunda División B players
Sporting de Gijón B players
Sporting de Gijón players
SD Eibar footballers
Spain youth international footballers